Brickyard Creek is a stream in the U.S. state of California. The steam runs  before it empties into Reeds Creek.

Brickyard was so named for a brick factory near its course.

References

Rivers of California
Rivers of Tehama County, California